Kenneth Walker (born August 18, 1964) is an American former professional basketball player. He played primarily for the New York Knicks of the National Basketball Association (NBA). Nicknamed "Sky" Walker, he won the NBA Slam Dunk Contest in 1989. He is currently a radio host for WVLK in Lexington, Kentucky.

Walker played college basketball for the Kentucky Wildcats. He was a first-team consensus All-American as a senior in 1986, and twice he was named the player of the year in the Southeastern Conference (SEC). He was selected by the Knicks in the first round of the 1986 NBA draft with the fifth overall pick.

College career

Walker was born in Roberta, Georgia. After being named Mr. Basketball in his home state of Georgia in 1982, Walker chose to play collegiately at the University of Kentucky. Walker had a very successful college career, being named to an All-SEC team four times and the All-American team twice. Walker's 1984 Kentucky team made it to the Final Four of the NCAA Tournament before losing to the Georgetown Hoyas.

In 1986, Walker set a record by scoring 11 times on 11 field goal attempts in the NCAA tournament.

Professional career
Walker was selected with the 5th pick of the 1986 NBA draft by the New York Knicks. Walker played for five coaches in five years with the Knicks. On February 11, 1989, Walker won the NBA Slam Dunk Contest, competing three days after the death of his father. He also secured third place in the 1990 contest. However, his success on the court was dwindling, and knee injuries forced him to leave the NBA and join the ACB league in Spain.

Walker returned to the NBA in 1993 to play two seasons with the Washington Bullets as a role player. He played a season (c.1998) for the Isuzu Motors Lynx/Giga Cats in Japan before retiring from professional basketball.

Post-retirement
From 2000-2021, Walker was the co-host of "Cat Talk," a syndicated radio call-in show with Wes Strader.

Walker lives in Lexington, and is active in the community, doing local radio and promoting childhood literacy.

Walker is a member of the 2018 Georgia Sports Hall of Fame in a class that includes former NFL star Champ Bailey, and Atlanta Falcons owner Arthur Blank.

References

External links

Kenny Walker – NBA statistics @ basketball-reference.com
Kenny Walker – UK statistics

1964 births
Living people
African-American basketball players
Akita Isuzu/Isuzu Motors Lynx/Giga Cats players
All-American college men's basketball players
American expatriate basketball people in Italy
American expatriate basketball people in Japan
American expatriate basketball people in Spain
American men's basketball players
American sports announcers
Basketball players from Georgia (U.S. state)
Kentucky Wildcats men's basketball players
Liga ACB players
McDonald's High School All-Americans
New York Knicks draft picks
New York Knicks players
Parade High School All-Americans (boys' basketball)
People from Crawford County, Georgia
Small forwards
Washington Bullets players
21st-century African-American people
20th-century African-American sportspeople